Illinois Route 145 is a north–south state road in southern Illinois. It splits off from U.S. Route 45 near Metropolis (across the Ohio River from Paducah, Kentucky) and runs north, rejoining U.S. 45 in Harrisburg.

Route description 
Illinois 145 runs through the central portion of Shawnee National Forest, and serves Dixon Springs State Park near Dixon Springs. It is a rural, two-lane road for its entire length. It is multi-plexed with Illinois 34 from its northern terminus at U.S. 45 in Harrisburg through Pankeyville and on to Mitchellsville where 34 spurs east to Rosiclaire. Between 34 and Eddyville is the small settlement of Delwood. The route also meets Illinois 147 6 miles south of Eddyville just north of Glendale. It connects with Illinois 146 just west of Dixon Springs. Eddyville Road which runs from Eddyville to just north of Golconda at Illinois 146 is a well maintained Pope County Route that serves as a shortcut from Eddyville to Golconda. In fact it saves several miles from having to drive south to 146 at Dixon Springs and then east on to Golconda.

On its original routing, Illinois 145 can be considered a spur of its "parent route", U.S. 45; with its extension in 1955, it can now be considered a "loop" of U.S. 45.

History 
SBI Route 145 originally ran from Metropolis north to Dixon Springs. In 1955 it was extended north to its current terminus.

Major Intersections

References 

145
Transportation in Massac County, Illinois
Transportation in Saline County, Illinois
Transportation in Pope County, Illinois